Fire Pro Wrestling World is a professional wrestling video game published by Spike Chunsoft. The game was released on Steam Early Access on July 11, 2017, with a full release for Steam on December 19, 2017 and released for PlayStation 4 on August 28, 2018 in the United States. The game is part of the Fire Pro Wrestling series.

Gameplay 
Fire Pro Wrestling World sees a return to the timing and strategy based gameplay the series has become famous for, which was dropped in the series' last game, Fire Pro Wrestling for the Xbox 360 in 2012, in favor of a button-mashing mini-game. Game modes include the traditional death matches, including steel cages, barbed wire and landmines, MMA rules matches, and more. Fire Pro Wrestling World is the first game in the series to incorporate online multiplayer, holding up to four players in a match.

At Wrestle Kingdom Fan Fest 2018, Spike Chunsoft announced that New Japan Pro-Wrestling would be officially licensed and would come complete with a Story Mode, dubbed Fighting Road, and at least the IWGP Heavyweight Championship. They also featured a Demo match for the Fire Pro World Championship, won by Kushida. A Jr. Heavyweight Fighting Road story, as well as a Promoter mode, dubbed Fire Promoter, were made available later as DLC shortly after release. On August 8, 2019, a DLC featuring wrestlers from the women's professional wrestling promotion World Wonder Ring Stardom was announced, with the DLC being released on August 21.

Reception

The PlayStation 4 version of Fire Pro Wrestling World received "generally favorable reviews" according to review aggregator website Metacritic.

Sam Brooke of Push Square called the game a fun return to form for the series, but criticized it for not being accessible to all gamers.

See also

New Japan Pro-Wrestling
World Wonder Ring Stardom
List of licensed wrestling video games
List of fighting games

References

External links
 Official Website

2017 video games
PlayStation 4 games
Spike Chunsoft video games
Fire Pro Wrestling
Video games developed in Japan
Video games scored by Atsuhiro Motoyama
Video games with AI-versus-AI modes
Windows games
New Japan Pro-Wrestling
World Wonder Ring Stardom
Professional wrestling games